Donald Jackson (born 14 January 1938, Lancashire, England) is a British calligrapher, official scribe and calligrapher to the Crown Office of United Kingdom of Great Britain and Northern Ireland. Jackson is artistic director of The Saint John's Bible, a hand-written and illuminated Bible commissioned by the Benedictine monastery of Saint John's Abbey in Collegeville, Minnesota, United States of America. He is the author of The Story of Writing and The Calligrapher's Art.

Parker Pen

Donald Jackson appears in a four-part series produced for Parker Pen, which is directed by Jeremy Bennett.

The first two parts cover letterforms up to the fourteenth century, in which Jackson demonstrates the making of both reed and quill pens and shows their influence on letterforms. Part three has a short section on printing, which covers the invention of the printing press and copper engraving. Part four focuses entirely on pens, handwriting, and calligraphy.

References

External links
 Myfonts page about Donald Jackson
Donald Jackson Scroll at the Newberry Library

1938 births
Living people
British calligraphers